The second edition of the Abu Dhabi Tour took place from 20 to 23 October 2016. It was part of the 2016 UCI Asia Tour, ranked as a 2.HC category event.

Teams
Eighteen teams entered the race. Each team had a maximum of six riders.

Route
The race consisted of four stages in the United Arab Emirates.

Stages

Stage 1

Stage 2

Stage 3

Stage 4

Result

References

External links
 2016 Abu Dhabi Tour at ProCyclingStats.com

Abu Dhabi Tour
Abu Dhabi
Abu Dhabi